Several memorials have been devoted to Theodore Roosevelt, the 26th president of the United States. Additionally, various groups have acted to preserve his legacy.

Theodore Roosevelt Association

In 1919, the Theodore Roosevelt Association (originally known as the Permanent Memorial National Committee) was founded by friends and supporters of Roosevelt. Soon renamed the Roosevelt Memorial Association (RMA), it was chartered in 1920 under Title 36 of the United States Code. In parallel with the RMA was an organization for women, The Women's Theodore Roosevelt Association, that had been founded in 1919 by an act of the New York State Assembly. Both organizations merged in 1956 under the current name. This organization preserved Roosevelt's papers in a 20-year project, preserved his photos and established four public sites: the reconstructed Theodore Roosevelt Birthplace National Historic Site, New York City, dedicated in 1923 and donated to the National Park Service in 1963; Theodore Roosevelt Memorial Park, Oyster Bay, Long Island, New York, dedicated in 1928 and given to the people of Oyster Bay; Theodore Roosevelt Island in the Potomac River in Washington, D.C., given to the federal government in 1932; Sagamore Hill, Roosevelt's Oyster Bay home, opened to the public in 1953 and was donated to the National Park Service in 1963 and is now the Sagamore Hill National Historic Site.

Another attempt at a presidential library

Dickinson State University in western North Dakota is attempting to create a presidential Library called the Theodore Roosevelt Center. It has pursued the mission of digitizing and archiving all of TR’s letters, diaries, photographs, political cartoons, audio and video recordings, as well as other media. In 2013, the North Dakota legislature appropriated $12 million to build an actual complex similar to the official libraries run by the National Archives. As of May 2017, the physical library is expected to be completed in 2019.

List of memorials

Communities
Roosevelt, Georgia
Roosevelt, Missouri

Counties
Roosevelt County, Montana
Roosevelt County, New Mexico

Lakes and dams
Theodore Roosevelt Dam
Theodore Roosevelt Lake

Military vessels
, troop transport in commission 1918–1919.
USS Theodore Roosevelt (SSBN-600), in commission 1961–1982.
USS Theodore Roosevelt (CVN-71), was commissioned in 1986.

Parks and forests
Roosevelt National Forest
Theodore Roosevelt Birthplace National Historic Site
Theodore Roosevelt Memorial Park
Theodore Roosevelt National Park

Roads and bridges
Roosevelt Boulevard in Philadelphia
Roosevelt Road in Chicago
Theodore Roosevelt Bridge on the Potomac River

Schools
 Theodore Roosevelt College and Career Academy, Gary, Indiana; formerly known as Theodore Roosevelt High School
 Theodore Roosevelt High School (Fresno)
 Theodore Roosevelt High School (Los Angeles)
 Theodore Roosevelt High School (Colorado)
 Roosevelt Senior High School (Washington, DC)
 President Theodore Roosevelt High School, Honolulu, Hawaii
 Theodore Roosevelt High School (Chicago)
 Theodore Roosevelt High School (Des Moines), Des Moines, Iowa
 Theodore Roosevelt High School (Wyandotte), Wyandotte, Michigan
 Roosevelt High School (Minneapolis)
 Roosevelt High School (St. Louis)
 Theodore Roosevelt High School (New York City)
 Theodore Roosevelt High School (Yonkers, New York)
 Roosevelt High School (Dayton, Ohio)
 Theodore Roosevelt High School (Kent, Ohio)
 Roosevelt High School (South Dakota)
 Theodore Roosevelt High School (San Antonio), San Antonio, Texas
 Roosevelt High School (Seattle)
 Theodore Roosevelt Elementary School (Kingsport, Tennessee)

Sculptures
Equestrian Statue of Theodore Roosevelt
Theodore Roosevelt, Rough Rider
Theodore Roosevelt Memorial (Portland, Oregon)
 Rough Rider (Oyster Bay)

Other
Roosevelt River
Roosevelt Room, in the White House
Roosevelt Study Center
Theodore Roosevelt Award
Theodore Roosevelt Association
Theodore Roosevelt Digital Library
Theodore Roosevelt Inaugural National Historic Site
Theodore Roosevelt Island
Theodore Roosevelt Federal Courthouse
In the America the Beautiful Quarters series, Roosevelt is on the Theodore Roosevelt N.P. Quarter
Along with three other presidents, Roosevelt appears on Mount Rushmore
 Minor planet 188693 Roosevelt

See also
 Presidential memorials in the United States

References

Theodore Roosevelt
Roosevelt, Theodore place names